Marienturm is a skyscraper in Frankfurt, Germany. Completed in 2019, it has a height of 155 meters, making it the 15th tallest building in Frankfurt beside Deutsche Bank Twin Towers. Located in the Bankenviertel, the building was built between 2015 and 2019 by real estate developer Pecan Development GmbH, and is primarily used for office space.

The building's contractor is Hochtief.

Location 
The tower is part of the Marieninsel project, which also contains a ten-story office building called the Marienforum.

Design 
The supporting structure of the building is a reinforced concrete skeleton, consisting of a flat reinforced concrete slab on each floor, and reinforced concrete columns that are arranged on the outside in the floor plan, and four reinforced concrete core areas. These serve for horizontal stiffening and are coupled to one another via the corridor ceilings and beams.

The interior design is inspired by the nearby Taunusanlage Park. The building contains a 17-metre-high lobby that acts as a transit zone between working environments and nature. This is assissted by contrasting materials, such as wood, stone, marble, and metal, and unique patterns and textures. The Marienforum has a similarly inspired design, albeit with different materials.

Usage 
In addition to commercial office space, a restaurant, a fitness studio, a children's day-care center and 267 underground car parks, including 77 parking spaces with electrical charging stations.

Awards 
The building has won several architectural awards, including the German Design Award in 2018.

Skyscrapers in Frankfurt

References

External Links 

 Official website

Skyscrapers in Frankfurt
Buildings and structures completed in 2019
2019 establishments in Germany
Skyscraper office buildings in Germany